Pizzo Massari is a mountain of the Lepontine Alps, overlooking Ambrì in the canton of Ticino. It is located on the chain separating the Val Lavizzara (upper Valle Maggia) from the Leventina. The lakes Lago del Sambuco and Lago Tremorgio lie on its western and eastern side respectively.

References

External links
 Pizzo Massari on Hikr

Mountains of the Alps
Mountains of Switzerland
Mountains of Ticino
Lepontine Alps